The Fatal Hour is a lost 1920 American feature-length silent film directed by George W. Terwilliger. It starred Broadway star Thomas W. Ross (1873–1959) and Wilfred Lytell, and was released by Metro Pictures.

Production
The Fatal Hour was filmed at Metro's East Coast facility in Manhattan, and exterior scenes showing the Tower of London were taken at sets built along the river in Stamford, Connecticut, under the supervision of art director M.P. Staulcup.

Cast
Thomas W. Ross - Jim Callender
Wilfred Lytell - Nigel Villiers
Frank Conlan - Lord Adolphus Villiers (credited as Francis X. Conlan)
Lionel Pape - The Duke of Exmoor
Jack Crosby - Dudley
Henry Hallam - Anthony
Louis Sealy - Felix (credited as Louis Sealey)
Frank Currier - The Abbot
Gladys Coburn - Dorothy Gore
Thea Talbot - Bessie Bissett
Jennie Dickerson - Mrs. Bissett
Florence Court - Lily de Mario
Marie Schaefer - Lady Margaret Villiers (credited as Marie Shaffer)
Effie Conley - Sally

References

External links

 

1920 films
American silent feature films
Lost American films
Metro Pictures films
1920 drama films
Silent American drama films
American black-and-white films
Films directed by George Terwilliger
1920 lost films
Lost drama films
1920s American films